The local assembly of bishops is the Episcopal Conference of Guinea (French: Conférence Episcopal de la Guinée, CEG).
The ECG is a member of the Regional Episcopal Conference of Francophone West Africa and Symposium of Episcopal Conferences of Africa and Madagascar (SECAM).

List of Presidents:

1970 - 1979: Raymond-Marie Tchidimbo, Archbishop of Conakry

1985 - 2001: Robert Sarah, Archbishop of Conakry

2002 - 2007: Philippe Kourouma, Bishop of N'Zérékoré

2007 - 2013: Vincent Coulibaly, Archbishop of Conakry

2013 - 2018: Emmanuel Félémou, Bishop of Kankan

2018 - ... : Raphaël Balla Guilavogui, Bishop of N’Zérékoré

See also
Catholic Church in Guinea

References

External links
 http://www.gcatholic.org/dioceses/country/GN.htm
 http://www.catholic-hierarchy.org/country/gn.html 

Guinea
Catholic Church in Guinea

it:Chiesa cattolica in Guinea#Conferenza episcopale